Faisalabad–Samundri Road (Punjabi), also known locally as Sumundri Road is a provincially maintained road in Punjab that extends from Faisalabad to Samundri.

Salient features
Length: 43 km

Lanes: 4 lanes

Speed limit: Universal minimum speed limit of 60 km/h and a maximum speed limit of 80 km/h for heavy transport vehicles and 100 km/h for light transport vehicles.

References

Roads in Punjab, Pakistan
Transport in Faisalabad District
Streets in Faisalabad